Gianetti is a surname. Notable people with the surname include:

 Gianetti Bonfim (born 1965), Brazilian racewalker
 Gustavo Gianetti (born 1979), Brazilian model
 Lautaro Gianetti (born 1993), Argentine footballer
 Marty Gianetti (born Fredrick Martin Jannetty; 1960), American professional wrestler
 Mauro Gianetti (born 1964), Swiss bicycle racer
 Noé Gianetti (born 1989), Swiss cyclist

See also
 Giannetti

Italian-language surnames
Patronymic surnames
Surnames from given names